Geoff Ian Sarjeant (born November 30, 1969) is a Canadian former professional ice hockey goaltender. He was drafted out of Michigan Tech by the St. Louis Blues in the 1990 NHL Supplemental Draft. He played four games in the National Hockey League (NHL) with the Blues in the 1994–95 season and four more with the San Jose Sharks in the 1995–96 season. Sarjeant was born in Orillia, Ontario.

In his brief NHL career, Sarjeant posted a record of 1–2–1 with a 4.12 GAA and a save percentage of .856.

Career statistics

Regular season and playoffs

External links

1969 births
Living people
Ayr Scottish Eagles players
Canadian expatriate ice hockey players in Germany
Canadian expatriate ice hockey players in Scotland
Canadian ice hockey goaltenders
Cincinnati Cyclones (IHL) players
Detroit Vipers players
Essen Mosquitoes players
Flint Generals players
Ice hockey people from Ontario
Indianapolis Ice players
Kansas City Blades players
Long Beach Ice Dogs (IHL) players
Michigan Tech Huskies men's ice hockey players
National Hockey League supplemental draft picks
People from Orillia
Peoria Rivermen (IHL) players
St. Louis Blues draft picks
St. Louis Blues players
San Jose Sharks players
Canadian expatriate ice hockey players in the United States